Louis Mercanton (4 May 1879 – 29 April 1932) was a Swiss film director, screenwriter and actor.

Mercanton was born in Nyon, Canton of Vaud, Switzerland and died in Neuilly-sur-Seine, France.

Partial filmography
Director
 Les Amours de la reine Élisabeth (1912) co-director
 Adrienne Lecouvreur (1913) co-director
 Infatuation aka Bouclette (1918)
 Miarka (1920)
 The Call of the Blood (1920)
 Possession (1922)
 The Gardens of Murcia (1923)
 Les Deux Gosses (1924) adaptation of the novel by Pierre Decourcelle
 Monte Carlo (1925)
 The Maid at the Palace (1927)
 Croquette (1927)
 Venus (1929)
 The Mystery of the Villa Rose (1930)
 The Nipper (1930)
 Octave (1930)
 Let's Get Married (1931)
 A Man of Mayfair (1931)
 These Charming People (1931)
 Cognasse (1932)
 Students in Paris (1932)
 The Fish Woman (1932)
 He Is Charming (1932)

References

External links

1879 births
1932 deaths
Swiss film directors
Swiss male film actors
Swiss screenwriters
Male screenwriters
People from Nyon
20th-century screenwriters